Preston Anthony Shumpert (20 August 1979), also known by his Turkish name of Mert Shumpert, is an American-born, naturalised-Turkish professional basketball player. He was twice named to the All-Big East first team while playing college basketball for Syracuse.

College
Shumpert appeared in 32 games in his freshman year with averages of 5.4 points and 2.4 rebounds.

Shumpert earned the spot of sixth man in his sophomore year, and led the team in 3-point percentage with a 42.9 percent clip. He also made four starts, and averaged 10.4 points per game.

In his junior season, Shumpert became a full-time starter and blossomed as one of the most prolific scorers in the Big East. He averaged 19.5 points that season, and was named the Big East's Most Improved Player, and was also a first-team All Big East selection.

In the early part of his senior season, Shumpert fulfilled expectations, as Syracuse jumped up to a 14-2 record and a No. 10 overall ranking. Shumpert led the way, scoring 30 or more points on seven occasions, including a career high 37 against Albany. 
Shumpert finished with career averages of 14.2 points and 4.4 rebounds per game.

Professional career
Undrafted by the NBA, Shumpert decided to go play overseas, first starting in France for the 2002-03 season, signed by Besançon BCD, in the French Pro-B. Following his stint in France, Shumpert has bounced around in the Italian professional leagues, including stints with Agricola Gloria M.T. (Serie A2, 2003–04), Villaggio Solidago Livorno (04-05), where he played in 2005 the Italian All Star Game, and Armani Jeans Milano (05-06).

He started the 2006-07 season with Climamio Bologna, before transferring in December to Benetton Treviso, starting 22 games and averaging 13.6 points, while helping them to the national cup. Shumpert came to Turkey to play for Beşiktaş Cola Turka in the 2007-08 season. After a very productive season in both Turkish league and ULEB Cup, he decided to follow coach Ergin Ataman and join Efes Pilsen. In August 2010 he signed with Galatasaray.

References

External links
 Euroleague Profile
 Serie A profile  Retrieved 11 August 2015
 TBLStat.net Profile
 Orangehoops.org Preston Shumpert Profile

1979 births
Living people
African-American basketball players
Aliağa Petkim basketball players
American emigrants to Turkey
American expatriate basketball people in France
American expatriate basketball people in Italy
American expatriate basketball people in Turkey
Anadolu Efes S.K. players
Basket Livorno players
Basketball players from Indiana
Besançon BCD players
Beşiktaş men's basketball players
Fortitudo Pallacanestro Bologna players
Galatasaray S.K. (men's basketball) players
Lega Basket Serie A players
Montecatiniterme Basketball players
Naturalized citizens of Turkey
Olimpia Milano players
Pallacanestro Treviso players
Sportspeople from Muncie, Indiana
Shooting guards
Syracuse Orange men's basketball players
Turkish men's basketball players
Turkish people of African-American descent
American men's basketball players
21st-century African-American sportspeople
20th-century African-American sportspeople